Letanovce is a village and municipality in the Spišská Nová Ves District in the Košice Region of central-eastern Slovakia.

In historical records the village was first mentioned in 1250.

The village lies at an altitude of 511 metres and covers an area of 21.38 km².

In 2011 has a population of 2133 inhabitants, about 70% are Slovaks, 20% are Roma.

External links
Official webpages of Letanovce
http://en.e-obce.sk/obec/letanovce/letanovce.html

Villages and municipalities in Spišská Nová Ves District
Romani communities in Slovakia